Madanpur, Nepal may refer to:

Madanpur, Bagmati
Madanpur, Narayani